Scando-Slavica is a biannual peer-reviewed academic journal covering Slavic and Baltic studies. It was established in 1954 and is published by Taylor & Francis on behalf of the Association of Scandinavian Slavists and Baltologists. Its first editor-in-chief was the Danish slavist Adolf Stender-Petersen.

Abstracting and indexing
The journal is abstracted and indexed in Emerging Sources Citation Index and Scopus.

References

External links

Print: 
Online: 

Slavic studies journals
Academic journals associated with learned and professional societies
Area studies journals
Taylor & Francis academic journals
Biannual journals
Multilingual journals
Publications established in 1954